The Airborne Sting is a series of Australian high-wing, single-seat hang gliders, designed and produced by Airborne Windsports of Redhead, New South Wales and introduced in the early 2000s.

Design and development
The Stings are intended to be intermediate hang gliders used for recreational flying. They all feature ease of handling with good performance

The Sting 2 154 XC model is made from 7075 aluminum tubing, with the semi-double-surface wing covered in Dacron sailcloth. Its  span wing is cable braced with a single kingpost supporting the ground wires. The nose angle is 121° and the aspect ratio is 5.7:1. The aircraft is certified as DHV 1-2.

Variants
Sting 2 118
Very small sized single-seat model with  wing area for very light pilots or those wishing a higher wing loading
Sting 2 140 X
Sting 2 154 XC
Sting 175 XC
Sting 3 154
Sting 3 168

Specifications (Sting 2 175 XC)

References

External links

Airborne Sting series official photo gallery

Hang gliders